Shane Gibson (born January 5, 1990) is an American professional basketball player for the Fraser Valley Bandits of the Canadian Elite Basketball League.

College career
He played college basketball for Sacred Heart, where he was a three-time All-Northeast Conference selection. In his junior season, Gibson averaged 22.0 points per game, fourth in the nation. He scored 21.6 points per game as a senior, ninth in NCAA Division I. Gibson finished his career with 2,079 points, the most in Sacred Heart's Division I years and eighth highest in school history overall.

Professional career
Gibson went undrafted in the 2013 NBA Draft, though he played for the Sacramento Kings in the Summer League. He did not play during the 2013–14 season. Gibson signed with the Idaho Stampede of the NBA D-League in 2014, where in 50 games he was averaging 26.5 minutes per game, 12.5 points per game, while  shooting 44.7% from the floor, 39.8% from three-point range and 87.1% at the foul line. In 2015, he played for Basket Recanati of the Italian Series A2 league before joining Halifax Hurricanes of NBL Canada.

On August 10, 2017, he joined AEK Larnaca of the Cypriot Division A. Gibson signed with Cibona on August 24, 2019.

In February 2021, Gibson joined Szolnoki Olajbányász of the Hungarian League.

In May 2022, Gibson signed with the Fraser Valley Bandits of the Canadian Elite Basketball League.

References

External links 
Shane Gibson at RealGM
Sacred Heart Pioneers bio

1990 births
Living people
AEK Larnaca B.C. players
American expatriate basketball people in Bulgaria
American expatriate basketball people in Canada
American expatriate basketball people in Croatia
American expatriate basketball people in Cyprus
American expatriate basketball people in Italy
American expatriate basketball people in Serbia
American men's basketball players
Basketball League of Serbia players
Basketball players from Connecticut
BC Beroe players
Halifax Hurricanes players
Idaho Stampede players
People from Killingly, Connecticut
Sacred Heart Pioneers men's basketball players
Telekom Baskets Bonn players
Guards (basketball)
KK Cibona players
KK Mladost Zemun players
Sportspeople from Windham County, Connecticut